The arrondissement of Grenoble is an arrondissement of France in the Isère department in the Auvergne-Rhône-Alpes region. It has 263 communes.

Composition

The communes of the arrondissement of Grenoble, and their INSEE codes, are:
 
 Les Adrets (38002)
 L'Albenc (38004)
 Allemond (38005)
 Allevard (38006)
 Ambel (38008)
 Auberives-en-Royans (38018)
 Auris (38020)
 Autrans-Méaudre-en-Vercors (38225)
 Avignonet (38023)
 Barraux (38027)
 Beaucroissant (38030)
 Beaufin (38031)
 Beaulieu (38033)
 Beauvoir-en-Royans (38036)
 Bernin (38039)
 Besse (38040)
 Bessins (38041)
 Biviers (38045)
 Le Bourg-d'Oisans (38052)
 Bresson (38057)
 Brié-et-Angonnes (38059)
 La Buisse (38061)
 La Buissière (38062)
 Champagnier (38068)
 Le Champ-près-Froges (38070)
 Champ-sur-Drac (38071)
 Chamrousse (38567)
 Chantepérier (38073)
 Chantesse (38074)
 Chapareillan (38075)
 La Chapelle-du-Bard (38078)
 Charnècles (38084)
 Chasselay (38086)
 Château-Bernard (38090)
 Châtel-en-Trièves (38456)
 Châtelus (38092)
 Chatte (38095)
 Chevrières (38099)
 Le Cheylas (38100)
 Chichilianne (38103)
 Chirens (38105)
 Cholonge (38106)
 Choranche (38108)
 Claix (38111)
 Clavans-en-Haut-Oisans (38112)
 Clelles (38113)
 Cognet (38116)
 Cognin-les-Gorges (38117)
 La Combe-de-Lancey (38120)
 Corenc (38126)
 Cornillon-en-Trièves (38127)
 Corps (38128)
 Corrençon-en-Vercors (38129)
 Les Côtes-de-Corps (38132)
 Coublevie (38133)
 Cras (38137)
 Crêts-en-Belledonne (38439)
 Crolles (38140)
 Les Deux Alpes (38253)
 Domène (38150)
 Échirolles (38151)
 Engins (38153)
 Entraigues (38154)
 Entre-deux-Guiers (38155)
 Eybens (38158)
 La Flachère (38166)
 Fontaine (38169)
 Fontanil-Cornillon (38170)
 Le Freney-d'Oisans (38173)
 Froges (38175)
 La Garde (38177)
 Gières (38179)
 Goncelin (38181)
 Grenoble (38185)
 Gresse-en-Vercors (38186)
 Le Gua (38187)
 Le Haut-Bréda (38163)
 Herbeys (38188)
 Huez (38191)
 Hurtières (38192)
 Izeaux (38194)
 Izeron (38195)
 Jarrie (38200)
 Laffrey (38203)
 Lalley (38204)
 Lans-en-Vercors (38205)
 Lavaldens (38207)
 Laval-en-Belledonne (38206)
 Lavars (38208)
 Livet-et-Gavet (38212)
 Lumbin (38214)
 Malleval-en-Vercors (38216)
 Marcieu (38217)
 Mayres-Savel (38224)
 Mens (38226)
 Meylan (38229)
 Miribel-Lanchâtre (38235)
 Miribel-les-Échelles (38236)
 Mizoën (38237)
 Moirans (38239)
 Monestier-d'Ambel (38241)
 Monestier-de-Clermont (38242)
 Le Monestier-du-Percy (38243)
 Montagne (38245)
 Montaud (38248)
 Montbonnot-Saint-Martin (38249)
 Montchaboud (38252)
 Monteynard (38254)
 Mont-Saint-Martin (38258)
 Morette (38263)
 La Morte (38264)
 La Motte-d'Aveillans (38265)
 La Motte-Saint-Martin (38266)
 Le Moutaret (38268)
 La Mure (38269)
 La Murette (38270)
 Murianette (38271)
 Murinais (38272)
 Nantes-en-Ratier (38273)
 Notre-Dame-de-Commiers (38277)
 Notre-Dame-de-l'Osier (38278)
 Notre-Dame-de-Mésage (38279)
 Notre-Dame-de-Vaulx (38280)
 Noyarey (38281)
 Oris-en-Rattier (38283)
 Ornon (38285)
 Oulles (38286)
 Oz (38289)
 Pellafol (38299)
 Percy (38301)
 La Pierre (38303)
 Pierre-Châtel (38304)
 Plateau-des-Petites-Roches (38395)
 Poisat (38309)
 Poliénas (38310)
 Ponsonnas (38313)
 Pontcharra (38314)
 Le Pont-de-Claix (38317)
 Pont-en-Royans (38319)
 Prébois (38321)
 Presles (38322)
 Proveysieux (38325)
 Prunières (38326)
 Quaix-en-Chartreuse (38328)
 Quet-en-Beaumont (38329)
 Quincieu (38330)
 Réaumont (38331)
 Renage (38332)
 Rencurel (38333)
 Revel (38334)
 Rives (38337)
 La Rivière (38338)
 Roissard (38342)
 Rovon (38345)
 Saint-Andéol (38355)
 Saint-André-en-Royans (38356)
 Saint-Antoine-l'Abbaye (38359)
 Saint-Appolinard (38360)
 Saint-Arey (38361)
 Saint-Aupre (38362)
 Saint-Barthélemy-de-Séchilienne (38364)
 Saint-Baudille-et-Pipet (38366)
 Saint-Blaise-du-Buis (38368)
 Saint-Bonnet-de-Chavagne (38370)
 Saint-Cassien (38373)
 Saint-Christophe-en-Oisans (38375)
 Saint-Christophe-sur-Guiers (38376)
 Sainte-Agnès (38350)
 Saint-Égrève (38382)
 Sainte-Luce (38414)
 Sainte-Marie-d'Alloix (38417)
 Sainte-Marie-du-Mont (38418)
 Saint-Étienne-de-Crossey (38383)
 Saint-Georges-de-Commiers (38388)
 Saint-Gervais (38390)
 Saint-Guillaume (38391)
 Saint-Hilaire-du-Rosier (38394)
 Saint-Honoré (38396)
 Saint-Ismier (38397)
 Saint-Jean-de-Moirans (38400)
 Saint-Jean-de-Vaulx (38402)
 Saint-Jean-d'Hérans (38403)
 Saint-Jean-le-Vieux (38404)
 Saint-Joseph-de-Rivière (38405)
 Saint-Just-de-Claix (38409)
 Saint-Lattier (38410)
 Saint-Laurent-du-Pont (38412)
 Saint-Laurent-en-Beaumont (38413)
 Saint-Marcellin (38416)
 Saint-Martin-de-Clelles (38419)
 Saint-Martin-de-la-Cluze (38115)
 Saint-Martin-d'Hères (38421)
 Saint-Martin-d'Uriage (38422)
 Saint-Martin-le-Vinoux (38423)
 Saint-Maurice-en-Trièves (38424)
 Saint-Maximin (38426)
 Saint-Michel-en-Beaumont (38428)
 Saint-Michel-les-Portes (38429)
 Saint-Mury-Monteymond (38430)
 Saint-Nazaire-les-Eymes (38431)
 Saint-Nicolas-de-Macherin (38432)
 Saint-Nizier-du-Moucherotte (38433)
 Saint-Paul-de-Varces (38436)
 Saint-Paul-lès-Monestier (38438)
 Saint-Pierre-de-Chartreuse (38442)
 Saint-Pierre-de-Chérennes (38443)
 Saint-Pierre-de-Méaroz (38444)
 Saint-Pierre-de-Mésage (38445)
 Saint-Pierre-d'Entremont (38446)
 Saint-Quentin-sur-Isère (38450)
 Saint-Romans (38453)
 Saint-Sauveur (38454)
 Saint-Théoffrey (38462)
 Saint-Vérand (38463)
 Saint-Vincent-de-Mercuze (38466)
 La Salette-Fallavaux (38469)
 La Salle-en-Beaumont (38470)
 Le Sappey-en-Chartreuse (38471)
 Sarcenas (38472)
 Sassenage (38474)
 Séchilienne (38478)
 Serre-Nerpol (38275)
 Seyssinet-Pariset (38485)
 Seyssins (38486)
 Siévoz (38489)
 Sinard (38492)
 La Sône (38495)
 Sousville (38497)
 La Sure en Chartreuse (38407)
 Susville (38499)
 Têche (38500)
 Tencin (38501)
 La Terrasse (38503)
 Theys (38504)
 Le Touvet (38511)
 Treffort (38513)
 Tréminis (38514)
 La Tronche (38516)
 Tullins (38517)
 Valbonnais (38518)
 La Valette (38521)
 Valjouffrey (38522)
 Varacieux (38523)
 Varces-Allières-et-Risset (38524)
 Vatilieu (38526)
 Vaujany (38527)
 Vaulnaveys-le-Bas (38528)
 Vaulnaveys-le-Haut (38529)
 Venon (38533)
 Le Versoud (38538)
 Veurey-Voroize (38540)
 Vif (38545)
 Villard-Bonnot (38547)
 Villard-de-Lans (38548)
 Villard-Notre-Dame (38549)
 Villard-Reculas (38550)
 Villard-Reymond (38551)
 Villard-Saint-Christophe (38552)
 Vinay (38559)
 Vizille (38562)
 Voiron (38563)
 Voreppe (38565)
 Vourey (38566)

History

The arrondissement of Grenoble was created in 1800. At the January 2017 reorganisation of the arrondissements of Isère, it lost 24 communes to the arrondissement of Vienne.

As a result of the reorganisation of the cantons of France which came into effect in 2015, the borders of the cantons are no longer related to the borders of the arrondissements. The cantons of the arrondissement of Grenoble were, as of January 2015:

 Allevard
 Le Bourg-d'Oisans
 Clelles
 Corps
 Domène
 Échirolles-Est
 Échirolles-Ouest
 Eybens
 Fontaine-Sassenage
 Fontaine-Seyssinet
 Goncelin
 Grenoble-1
 Grenoble-2
 Grenoble-3
 Grenoble-4
 Grenoble-5
 Grenoble-6
 Mens
 Meylan
 Monestier-de-Clermont
 La Mure
 Pont-en-Royans
 Rives
 Roybon
 Saint-Égrève
 Saint-Étienne-de-Saint-Geoirs
 Saint-Ismier
 Saint-Laurent-du-Pont
 Saint-Marcellin
 Saint-Martin-d'Hères-Nord
 Saint-Martin-d'Hères-Sud
 Le Touvet
 Tullins
 Valbonnais
 Vif
 Villard-de-Lans
 Vinay
 Vizille
 Voiron

References

Grenoble
Grenoble